Víctor Aragón (born 23 December 1966) is a Bolivian footballer. He played in two matches for the Bolivia national football team in 1991. He was also part of Bolivia's squad for the 1991 Copa América tournament.

References

External links
 

1966 births
Living people
Bolivian footballers
Bolivia international footballers
Place of birth missing (living people)
Association football goalkeepers